Goran oil field is an Albanian oil field that was discovered in 1975. It is one of the biggest on-shore oil field of Albania. It began production in 1976 and produces oil.

See also

Oil fields of Albania

References

Oil fields of Albania